Rodongja Sports Club is a North Korean football club. Rodongja means worker in Korean.

References

 
Football clubs in North Korea